Simsala Grimm is a German animated children's television series, consisting of stories based on fairy tales by the Brothers Grimm, Hans Christian Andersen, and other notable authors. The series was created by André Sikojev, Stefan Beiten and Claus Clausen, and co-producted by Greenlight Media AG, Norddeutscher Rundfunk, Hahn Film AG, Millimages and Magma Films Ltd.

Synopsis
In each episode of the series, one of the famous classical fairy tales is told in the magical land of Simsala. The local characters Yoyo and Doc Croc move between the storyteller and the episode cast, which they tend to help or at least inspire. Each episode begins with Yoyo and Doc Croc as toys on a shelf brought to life by a magical book.

Characters

Main
Yoyo (German: Hubertus von Lerchenfeld, English: Nigel Greaves) – An adventurous, joyful, brave and mischievous blue coyote. He wears a red hood shoulder piece with two dangling bells.
Doc Croc (nicknamed Crocy; German: Jörg Stuttmann, English: Nigel Pegram) – A bookworm, a red-pink lizard. He wears glasses and a yellow hat, and carries a yellow bag with him. He is kind, timid and smart. It also appears as if Doc Croc has a slight stutter in his voice.
 Storybook (Märchenbuch; German: Bert Franzke, English: Erik Hansen) – the book that brings Yoyo and Doc Croc to life and takes them to the land of Simsala. In the first season, it has portraits of the brothers Grimm in the hardcover.

Both Yoyo and Doc Croc often argue as Yoyo is brave and willing, but unwise and Doc Croc is sometimes overcautious, yet intelligent. Both of them also seem to disrespect the storybook, as it usually takes them to a bad place when they are landing.

Recurring
Birds - Three clothed birds appear in numerous episodes of the first season, often providing/singing advice or insight to Yoyo and Doc Croc.
Mice - Three clothed mice appear in numerous episodes of the first season, often providing advice or insight, sometimes even help, to Yoyo and Doc Croc.

Episodes

Season 1 (1999-2000)

Season 2 (2010)

Broadcast
Simsala Grimm premiered on KiKA in Germany on November 1, 1999, and ended on July 21, 2000. It was later renewed for a second season, which premiered on December 6, 2010, and ended on December 31 of the same year.

The English version of the series premiered in Australia in 2001 on ABC Kids, and later on RTÉ2 in Ireland. In addition, the first season of the series was distributed on DVDs in the United States in 2004, under the name "The Fairy Tales of the Brothers Grimm".

A third season was announced in 2019. Remastered versions of the previous seasons were produced as well, and were released on Amazon Prime Video in March 2021 in Germany and the United Kingdom, with the German version in particular releasing in theaters starting October 28, 2021. On November 7, 2021, a series of radio plays was announced for an early 2022 release, with the first episode, based on The Seven Ravens, releasing on February 11 on Spotify, Deezer, and Napster.

Proposed film adaptation

In 2002, Greenlight Media partnered with Berlin Animation Film and John H. Williams of Vanguard Animation to produce a film adaptation that would have been known domestically as Happily N'Ever After, which would have revolved around Cinderella's stepmother taking over the land of Simsala. The film would have starred Andy Dick as Yoyo, and Wallace Shawn as Doc Croc, with the additional voices of Freddie Prinze Jr., Sarah Michelle Gellar, George Carlin and Sigourney Weaver. By 2003, Grenlight Media would sell its interest in the film, and while the film did get released in 2007, all connections to the series were removed from the final project.

In March 2019, with the celebration of 20th anniversary of the series, Greenlight Media announced that it signed a deal with Fabula Media Group to produce animated feature film based on the show, as well as the third season is in development.

See also
List of German television series

Notes

References

External links

1990s German television series
2000s German television series
2010s French television series
1990s animated television series
1999 German television series debuts
German children's animated adventure television series
German children's animated fantasy television series
French children's animated adventure television series
French children's animated fantasy television series
English-language television shows
German-language television shows
Australian Broadcasting Corporation original programming
Television shows based on fairy tales
Animated television series about mammals
Fictional coyotes
Animated television series about reptiles and amphibians
Fictional lizards
Animated television series about birds
Animated television series about mice and rats
Television series about witchcraft